Jonas Behounek (born 17 May 1998) is a German professional footballer who plays as a defender for Eintracht Norderstedt.

Career
Behounek made his professional debut for Sonnenhof Großaspach in the 3. Liga on 20 July 2019, starting in the away match against MSV Duisburg, which finished as a 1–4 loss.

Personal life
Behounek was born in Kaltenkirchen, Schleswig-Holstein and is of Czech descent.

References

External links
 
 

1998 births
Living people
People from Segeberg
Footballers from Schleswig-Holstein
German footballers
Germany youth international footballers
German people of Czech descent
Association football defenders
Hamburger SV II players
SG Sonnenhof Großaspach players
Rot-Weiss Essen players
FC Eintracht Norderstedt 03 players
3. Liga players
Regionalliga players